The following is the filmography of American animator Chuck Jones.

Warner Bros. Cartoons Inc.

Looney Tunes/Merrie Melodies

Theatrical shorts (1938–1964) 
 The Night Watchman (1938) (director)
 Dog Gone Modern (1939) (director)
 Robin Hood Makes Good (1939) (director)
 Prest-O Change-O (1939) (director)
 Daffy Duck and the Dinosaur (1939) (director)
 Naughty but Mice (1939) (director)
 Old Glory (1939) (director)
 Snowman's Land (1939) (director)
 Little Brother Rat (1939) (director)
 The Little Lion Hunter (1939) (director)
 The Good Egg (1939) (director)
 Sniffles and the Bookworm (1939) (director)
 The Curious Puppy (1939) (director)
 Mighty Hunters (1940) (director)
 Elmer's Candid Camera (1940) (director)
 Sniffles Takes a Trip (1940) (director)
 Tom Thumb in Trouble (1940) (director)
 The Egg Collector (1940) (director)
 Ghost Wanted (1940) (director)
 Stage Fright (1940) (director)
 Good Night, Elmer (1940) (director)
 Bedtime for Sniffles (1940) (director)
 Elmer's Pet Rabbit (1941) (director)
 Sniffles Bells the Cat (1941) (director)
 Joe Glow, the Firefly (1941) (director)
 Porky's Ant (1941) (director)
 Toy Trouble (1941) (director)
 Porky's Prize Pony (1941) (director)
 Inki and the Lion (1941) (director)
 Snow Time for Comedy (1941) (director)
 The Brave Little Bat (1941) (director)
 Saddle Silly (1941) (director)
 Porky's Midnight Matinee (1941) (director)
 The Bird Came C.O.D. (1942) (director)
 Porky's Cafe (1942) (director)
 Conrad the Sailor (1942) (director)
 Dog Tired (1942) (director)
 The Draft Horse (1942) (director)
 Hold the Lion, Please (1942) (director)
 The Squawkin' Hawk  (1942) (director)
 Fox Pop (1942) (director)
 The Dover Boys (1942) (director)
 My Favorite Duck (1942) (director)
 Case of the Missing Hare (1942) (director)
 To Duck or Not to Duck (1943) (director)
 Flop Goes the Weasel (1943) (director)
 Super-Rabbit (1943) (director)
 The Unbearable Bear (1943) (director)
 The Aristo-Cat (1943) (director)
 Wackiki Wabbit (1943) (director)
 Fin'n Catty (1943) (director)
 Inki and the Minah Bird (1943) (director)
 Tom Turk and Daffy (1944) (director)
 Bugs Bunny and the Three Bears (1944) (director)
 The Weakly Reporter (1944) (director)
 Angel Puss (1944) (director)
 From Hand to Mouse (1944) (director)
 Lost and Foundling (1944) (director)
 Odor-able Kitty (1945) (director)
 Trap Happy Porky (1945) (director)
 Hare Conditioned (1945) (director)
 Fresh Airedale (1945) (director)
 Hare Tonic (1945) (director)
 Quentin Quail (1946) (director)
 Hush My Mouse (1946) (director)
 Hair-Raising Hare (1946) (director)
 The Eager Beaver  (1946) (director)
 Fair and Worm-er (1946) (director)
 Roughly Squeaking (1946) (director)
 Scent-imental Over You (1947) (director)
 Inki at the Circus (1947) (director)
 A Pest in the House (1947) (director)
 Little Orphan Airedale (1947) (director)
 House Hunting Mice (1948) (director)
 A Feather in His Hare (1948) (director)
 What's Brewin', Bruin? (1948) (director)
 Rabbit Punch (1948) (director)
 Haredevil Hare (1948) (director)
 You Were Never Duckier (1948) (director)
 Daffy Dilly (1948) (director)
 My Bunny Lies over the Sea (1948) (director)
 Scaredy Cat (1948) (director)
 Awful Orphan (1949) (director)
 Mississippi Hare (1949) (director)
 Mouse Wreckers (1949) (director)
 The Bee-Deviled Bruin (1949) (director)
 Long-Haired Hare (1949) (director)
 Often an Orphan (1949) (director)
 Fast and Furry-ous (1949) (director)
 Frigid Hare (1949) (director)
 For Scent-imental Reasons (1949) (director)
 Bear Feat (1949) (director)
 Rabbit Hood (1949) (director)
 The Scarlet Pumpernickel (1950) (director)
 Homeless Hare (1950) (director)
 The Hypo-Chondri-Cat (1950) (director)
 8 Ball Bunny (1950) (director)
 Dog Gone South (1950) (director)
 The Ducksters (1950) (director)
 Caveman Inki (1950) (director)
 Rabbit of Seville (1950) (director)
 Two's a Crowd (1950) (director)
 Bunny Hugged (1951) (director)
 Scent-imental Romeo (1951) (director)
 A Hound for Trouble (1951) (director)
 Rabbit Fire (1951) (director)
 Chow Hound (1951) (director)
 The Wearing of the Grin (1951) (director)
 Cheese Chasers (1951) (director)
 A Bear for Punishment (1951) (director)
 Drip-Along Daffy (1951) (director)
 Operation: Rabbit (1952) (director)
 Feed the Kitty (1952) (director)
 Little Beau Pepé (1952) (director)
 Water, Water Every Hare (1952) (director)
 Orange Blossoms for Violet (1952) (director)
 Beep, Beep (1952) (director)
 The Hasty Hare  (1952) (director)
 Going! Going! Gosh! (1952) (director)
 Mouse-Warming (1952) (director)
 Rabbit Seasoning (1952) (director)
 Terrier Stricken (1952) (director)
 Don't Give Up the Sheep (1953) (director)
 Forward March Hare (1953) (director)
 Kiss Me Cate (1953) (director)
 Duck Amuck (1953) (director)
 Much Ado About Nutting (1953) (director)
 Wild Over You (1953) (director)
 Duck Dodgers in the 24½th Century (1953) (director)
 Bully for Bugs (1953) (director)
 Zipping Along (1953) (director)
 Lumber Jack-Rabbit (1953) (director)
 Duck! Rabbit, Duck! (1953) (director)
 Punch Trunk (1953) (director)
 Feline Frame-Up (1954) (director)
 No Barking (1954) (director)
 The Cat's Bah (1954) (director)
 Claws for Alarm (1954) (director)
 Bewitched Bunny (1954) (director)
 Stop! Look! And Hasten! (1954) (director)
 From A to Z-Z-Z-Z (1954) (director)
 My Little Duckaroo (1954) (director)
 Sheep Ahoy (1954) (director)
 Baby Buggy Bunny (1954) (director)
 Beanstalk Bunny (1955) (director)
 Ready, Set, Zoom! (1955) (director)
 Past Perfumance (1955) (director)
 Rabbit Rampage (1955) (director)
 Double or Mutton (1955) (director)
 Jumpin' Jupiter (1955) (director)
 Knight-mare Hare (1955) (director)
 Two Scent's Worth (1955) (writer & director)
 Guided Muscle (1955) (director)
 One Froggy Evening (1955) (director)
 A Hitch in Time (1955) (director)
 Bugs' Bonnets (1956) (director)
 Broom-Stick Bunny (1956) (director)
 Rocket Squad (1956) (director)
 Heaven Scent (1956) (writer & director)
 Gee Whiz-z-z-z-z-z-z (1956) (director)
 Barbary Coast Bunny (1956) (director)
 Rocket-bye Baby (1956) (director)
 Deduce, You Say (1956) (director)
 There They Go-Go-Go! (1956) (director)
 To Hare Is Human (1956) (director)
 Scrambled Aches (1957) (director)
 Ali Baba Bunny (1957) (director)
 Go Fly a Kit (1957) (director)
 Boyhood Daze (1957) (director)
 Steal Wool (1957) (director)
 What's Opera, Doc? (1957) (director)
 Zoom and Bored (1957) (director)
 Touché and Go (1957) (director)
 Robin Hood Daffy (1958) (director)
 Hare-Way to the Stars (1958) (director)
 Whoa, Be-Gone! (1958) (director)
 To Itch His Own (1958) (director)
 Hook, Line and Stinker (1958) (director)
 Hip Hip-Hurry! (1958) (director)
 Cat Feud (1958) (director)
 Baton Bunny (1959) (director with Abe Levitow)
 Hot-Rod and Reel! (1959) (director)
 Wild About Hurry (1959) (director)
 Fastest with the Mostest (1960) (director)
 Who Scent You? (1960) (director)
 Rabbit's Feat (1960) (director)
 Ready, Woolen and Able (1960) (director)
 Hopalong Casualty (1960) (writer and director)
 High Note (1960) (director)
 Zip 'N Snort (1961) (writer and director)
 The Mouse on 57th Street (1961) (director)
 The Abominable Snow Rabbit (1961) (director with Maurice Noble)
 Lickety-Splat (1961) (writer, director with Abe Levitow)
 A Scent of the Matterhorn (1961) (writer & director, credited as M. Charl Jones)
 Compressed Hare (1961) (director with Maurice Noble)
 Beep Prepared (1961) (writer with John Dunn, director with Maurice Noble)
 Nelly's Folly (1961) (writer with David Detiege, director with Abe Levitow & Maurice Noble)
 A Sheep in the Deep (1962) (writer, director with Maurice Noble)
 Zoom at the Top (1962) (writer, director with Maurice Noble)
 Louvre Come Back to Me! (1962) (director with Maurice Noble)
 Martian Through Georgia (1962) (writer with Carl Kohler, director with Abe Levitow & Maurice Noble)
 I Was a Teenage Thumb (1963) (writer with John Dunn, director with Maurice Noble)
 Now Hear This (1963) (writer with John Dunn, director with Maurice Noble)
 Woolen Under Where (1963) (writer)
 Hare-Breadth Hurry (1963) (director with Maurice Noble)
 Mad as a Mars Hare (1963) (director with Maurice Noble)
 Transylvania 6-5000 (1963) (director with Maurice Noble)
 To Beep or Not to Beep (1963) (writer with John Dunn, director with Maurice Noble & Tom Ray)
 The Iceman Ducketh (1964) (uncredited director with Phil Monroe & Maurice Noble)
 War and Pieces (1964) (director with Maurice Noble)

Television shows and pilot 
 The Bugs Bunny Show (1960)
 Adventures of the Road Runner (1962) (writer with John Dunn & Michael Maltese, director with Maurice Noble & Tom Ray)
 This unsuccessful television pilot was later broken up into three theatrical cartoons:
 To Beep or Not to Beep (released as a theatrical short in 1963)
 Zip Zip Hooray (Jones not involved)
 Roadrunner A Go Go (Jones not involved)
 The Porky Pig Show (1964) (Jones not involved,archive footage)
 The Road Runner Show (1966) (Jones not involved,archive footage)
 The Bugs Bunny/Road Runner Hour (1968) (Jones not involved,archive footage)

Work for the U.S. Government 
 Point Rationing of Foods (1943) (uncredited)
 Coming Snafu (1943) (uncredited)
 Spies (1943) (uncredited)
 The Infantry Blues (1943) (uncredited)
 Private Snafu vs. Malaria Mike (1944) (uncredited)
 A Lecture on Camouflage (1944) (uncredited)
 Gas (1944) (uncredited)
 Outpost (1944) (uncredited)
 Going Home (1944) (uncredited)
 The Good Egg (1945) (uncredited) (not to be confused with the 1939 cartoon of the same title)
 In the Aleutians (1945) (uncredited)
 It's Murder She Says (1945) (uncredited)
 No Buddy Atoll (1945) (uncredited)
 Secrets of the Caribbean (1945) (uncredited)
 So Much for So Little (1949)
 90 Days Wondering (1956) (Ralph Phillips)
 Drafty, Isn't It? (1957) (Ralph Phillips)

at United Productions of America 
Industrial Short
 Hell-Bent for Election (1944) (produced for United Auto Workers)

Theatrical Feature Film:
 Gay Purr-ee (1962; in conjunction with UPA)1

 Jones was sacked by Warner Bros Cartoon Inc, after they found out about Jones involvement with this film.

at MGM Animation/Visual Arts

Theatrical shorts

Tom and Jerry (1963–1967) 
1963
 Pent-House Mouse (producer, writer with Michael Maltese, director with Maurice Noble)

1964
 The Cat Above and The Mouse Below (producer, writer with Michael Maltese, director with Maurice Noble)
 Is There a Doctor in the Mouse? (producer, writer with Michael Maltese, director with Maurice Noble)
 Much Ado About Mousing (producer, director with Maurice Noble)
 Snowbody Loves Me (producer, writer with Michael Maltese, director with Maurice Noble)
 The Unshrinkable Jerry Mouse (producer, writer with Michael Maltese, director with Maurice Noble)

1965
 Ah, Sweet Mouse-Story of Life (producer, writer with Michael Maltese, director with Maurice Noble)
 Tom-ic Energy (producer, writer with Michael Maltese, director with Maurice Noble)
 Bad Day at Cat Rock (producer & writer, director with Maurice Noble)
 The Brothers Carry-Mouse-Off (producer, writer with Jim Pabian)
 Haunted Mouse (producer, writer with Jim Pabian, director with Maurice Noble)
 I'm Just Wild About Jerry (producer, writer with Michael Maltese, director with Maurice Noble, uncredited voice actor)
 Of Feline Bondage (producer, writer with Don Towsley, director with Maurice Noble)
 The Year of the Mouse (producer, writer with Michael Maltese, director with Maurice Noble)
 The Cat's Me-Ouch! (producer, writer with Michael Maltese, director with Maurice Noble, uncredited voice actor)

1966
 Duel Personality (producer, writer with Michael Maltese, director with Maurice Noble, uncredited voice actor)
 Jerry, Jerry, Quite Contrary (producer & writer, director with Maurice Noble)
 Jerry-Go-Round (producer, uncredited director with Abe Levitow & Maurice Noble, the latter of which was also uncredited)
 Love Me, Love My Mouse (producer, director with Ben Washam)
 Puss 'n' Boats (producer)
 Filet Meow (producer)
 Matinee Mouse (uncredited producer)
 The A-Tom-Inable Snowman (producer)
 Catty-Cornered (producer, uncredited director with Abe Levitow, uncredited writer with John Dunn & Michael Maltese, the latter of which was also uncredited)

1967
 Cat and Dupli-cat (producer, writer with Michael Maltese, director with Maurice Noble)
 O-Solar Meow (producer)
 Guided Mouse-ille (producer)
 Rock 'n' Rodent (producer)
 Cannery Rodent (producer & writer, director with Maurice Noble)
 The Mouse from H.U.N.G.E.R. (producer)
 Surf-Bored Cat (producer)
 Shutter Bugged Cat (uncredited producer)
 Advance and Be Mechanized (producer, uncredited voice actor)
 Purr-Chance to Dream (producer, uncredited director with Ben Washam, uncredited writer with Irv Spector & Michael Maltese, the latter of which was also uncredited)

One-shot theatrical shorts 
 The Dot and the Line (1965)  Oscar winner (producer with Les Goldman, director with Maurice Noble)
 The Bear That Wasn't (1967) (co-producer with Frank Tashlin despite Tsdhlin  having no involvement in the film's production, although he did write the book), director with Maurice Noble)

Feature Film 
 The Phantom Tollbooth (1970) (co-producer with Les Goldman & Abe Levitow, screenplay with Sam Rosen, director with Abe Levitow & Dave Monahan)

Television shows 
 Tom and Jerry (1965) (titles, bumpers, & reanimating offensive content form the following Hanna-Barbera shorts - The Little Orphan; Saturday Evening Puss; The Framed Cat; Dog Trouble; The Truce Hurts; Triplet Trouble; Push-Button Kitty; Nit-Witty Kitty)
 Off to See the Wizard (1967–1968)

Television Specials 
 How the Grinch Stole Christmas! (1966) (co-produced with Ted Geisel, director with Ben Washam)
 The Pogo Special Birthday Special (1969) (co-produced with Walt Kelly, director with Ben Washam, voice actor)
 Horton Hears a Who! (1970) (storyboard artist with Bob Ogle, producer with Ted Geisel, director with Ben Washam, voice actor)
 The Cat in the Hat (1971; in conjunction with DePatie–Freleng Enterprises1) (storyboard artist, producer with Ted Geisel)

1: Jones left the production of this special before it was finished after a rift with Geisel, DePatie-Freleng completed the special.

Chuck Jones Productions/Enterprises

Original works

Theatrical features 
 Mrs. Doubtfire (1993) (animation opening sequence only; Pudgy & Grunge)

Television Shows 
 Curiosity Shop (1971–72) (Executive Producer)

Theatrical short films 
 Man the Polluter (1973) (animation sequence directed by)

Television Specials 
Cricket
 The Cricket in Times Square  (1973)
 A Very Merry Cricket (1973)
 Yankee Doodle Cricket (1975)
The Jungle Book
 The White Seal (1975)
 Rikki-Tikki-Tavi (1975)
 Mowgli's Brothers (1976)
Raggedy Ann and Andy
 Raggedy Ann and Andy in The Great Santa Claus Caper (1978)
 Raggedy Ann and Andy in The Pumpkin Who Couldn't Smile (1979)

Other specials and TV shows
 Gateways of the Mind (1958) Animated sequences by Chuck Jones and Maurice Noble. 
 A Chipmunk Christmas (1981) (character designer and creative consultant, co-produced with Bagdasarian Productions)
 Peter and the Wolf (1995)

Looney Tunes/Merrie Melodies

Theatrical features 
 The Bugs Bunny/Road Runner Movie (1979) (Original bridge animation only)
 Gremlins 2: The New Batch (1990) (animated opening and end credits, featuring Daffy Duck and Bugs Bunny, co-produced with Warner Bros. Feature Animation)
 Stay Tuned (1992) (Robocat segment of Rooney Tunes, co-produced with Warner Bros. Feature Animation)

Theatrical shorts (1994–1997) 
 Chariots of Fur (1994) (producer with Linda Jones Clough, writer and director)
 Another Froggy Evening (1995) (producer with Linda Jones Clough, writer with Don Arioli, Stephen A. Fossati, and Stan Freberg, director)
 Superior Duck (1996) (producer with Linda Jones Clough, writer and director)
 Father of the Bird (1997) (producer with Linda Jones Clough)
 Pullet Surprise (1997) (producer with Linda Jones Clough)
 From Hare to Eternity (1997) (producer with Linda Jones Clough, director)

Televsion series and specials 
 The Electric Company (1971) (Wile E. Coyote and Road Runner segments only)
 Bugs and Daffy's Carnival of the Animals (1976) (All-new special featuring Bugs Bunny and Daffy Duck)  
 Bugs Bunny in King Arthur's Court (1978) (All-new special featuring Bugs Bunny and Daffy Duck)  
 Bugs Bunny's Looney Christmas Tales (1979) (Co-produced by DePatie–Freleng Enterprises)
 Bugs Bunny's Bustin' Out All Over (1980)
 Daffy Duck's Thanks-for-Giving (1980)

See also 
 Warner Bros. Cartoons
 Warner Bros. Animation

Externals links 
 filmography

References 

Director filmographies
Male actor filmographies
American filmographies